Shelby Mahurin is an American young adult fiction author, best known for writing the Serpent & Dove trilogy.

Early life
Mahurin grew up on a small farm in rural Indiana. She attended Turkey Run High School in Marshall, Indiana. She currently lives near her childhood home with her husband, children and pets.

Career
Mahurin's debut novel Serpent & Dove debuted at #2 on The New York Times bestseller list. It was the Barnes & Noble YA Book Club selection for September 2019.

Bibliography

Serpent & Dove series

The Scarlet Veil series 

 The Scarlet Veil. HarperTeen. 2023.

References

External links 
Official website
Interview with The Nerd Daily
Chat at YA Books Central

Women writers of young adult literature
American women writers
Living people
21st-century American women
1992 births